Cureña is a district of the Sarapiquí canton, in the Heredia province of Costa Rica.

History 
Cureña was created on 6 October 1999 by Decreto Ejecutivo 28137-G.

Location 

It is located in the northern region of the country and borders the districts of La Virgen to the south, Puerto Viejo to the east, the province of Alajuela to the west and Nicaragua to the north.

Geography 
Cureña has an area of  km² and an elevation of  metres. It is the fourth district of the canton by area.

It presents a plain territory by dominated by the plains of Sarapiquí.

Demographics 

For the 2011 census, Cureña had a population of  inhabitants.

Settlements
The 12 population centers of the district are:

Golfito (head of the district)
Caño Tambor
Copalchí
Cureñita
Paloseco
Remolinito
Tambor
Tierrabuena
Trinidad (Boca Sarapiquí)
Unión del Toro
Vuelta Cabo de Hornos
Los Angeles del Río

Economy 

As in its neighboring district of Llanuras del Gaspar, agriculture (banana, pineapple, yucca and banana) is the base of the local economy.

Transportation

Road transportation 
The district is covered by the following road routes:
 National Route 745

References 

Districts of Heredia Province
Populated places in Heredia Province